Gebroek is a hamlet in the Dutch province of Limburg. It is a part of the municipality of Echt-Susteren, and lies about 11 km north of Sittard.

The hamlet was first mentioned around 1700 as Broich, and means "swampy land". Gebroek was home to 150 people in 1840.

Gallery

References

Populated places in Limburg (Netherlands)
Echt-Susteren